This is a list of schools in the London Borough of Tower Hamlets, England.

State-funded schools

Primary schools

 Arnhem Wharf Primary School
 Bangabandhu Primary School
 Ben Jonson Primary School
 Bigland Green Primary School
 Blue Gate Fields Infants' School
 Blue Gate Fields Junior School
 Bonner Primary School
 Bygrove Primary School
 Canary Wharf College East Ferry
 Canary Wharf College Glenworth
 Canon Barnett Primary School
 Cayley Primary School
 Chisenhale Primary School
 Christ Church CE School
 The Clara Grant Primary School
 Columbia Primary School
 Cubitt Town Primary School
 Culloden Primary
 Cyril Jackson Primary School
 Elizabeth Selby Infants' School
 English Martyrs RC Primary School
 Globe Primary School
 Hague Primary School
 Halley Primary School
 Harbinger Primary School
 Harry Gosling Primary School
 Hermitage Primary School
 John Scurr Primary School
 Kobi Nazrul Primary School
 Lansbury Lawrence School
 Lawdale Junior School
 Malmesbury Primary School
 Manorfield Primary School
 Marion Richardson Primary School
 Marner Primary School
 Mayflower Primary School
 Mowlem Primary School
 Mulberry Wood Wharf Primary School
 Old Ford Primary
 Old Palace Primary School
 Olga Primary School
 Osmani Primary School
 Our Lady and St Joseph RC School
 Redlands Primary School
 St Agnes RC Primary School
 St Anne's and Guardian Angels RC Primary School
 St Edmund's RC School
 St Elizabeth RC Primary School
 St John's CE Primary School
 St Luke's CE Primary School
 St Mary and St Michael Primary School
 St Paul with St Luke CE Primary School
 St Paul's Way Trust School
 St Paul's Whitechapel CE Primary School
 St Peter's London Docks CE Primary School
 St Saviour's CE Primary School
 Seven Mills Primary School
 Sir William Burrough Primary School
 Solebay Primary
 Stebon Primary School
 Stepney Greencoat CE Primary School
 Stepney Park Primary School
 Stewart Headlam Primary School
 Thomas Buxton Primary School
 Virginia Primary School
 Wellington Primary School
 William Davis Primary School
 Woolmore Primary School

Secondary schools

 Bishop Challoner Catholic Collegiate School
 Bow School
 Canary Wharf College Crossharbour
 Central Foundation Girls' School
 George Green's School
 Langdon Park School
 London Enterprise Academy
 Morpeth School
 Mulberry Academy Shoreditch
 Mulberry School for Girls
 Mulberry Stepney Green Maths, Computing and Science College
 Mulberry UTC
 Oaklands School
 St Paul's Way Trust School
 Stepney All Saints School
 Swanlea School
 Wapping High School

Special and alternative schools
 Beatrice Tate School
 Bowden House School
 Ian Mikardo School
 London East Alternative Provision
 Phoenix School
 South Quay College
 Stephen Hawking School

Further education
 Ada, the National College for Digital Skills
 East London Arts & Music
 Tower Hamlets College
 Workers' Educational Association

Independent schools

Primary and preparatory schools
 Al-Mizan School
 Buttercup Primary School
 Date Palm Primary School
 Faraday School
 Gatehouse School

Senior and all-through schools
 Darul Hadis Latifiah
 Jamiatul Ummah School
 London East Academy
 London Islamic School
 Madani Girls' School
 Mazahirul Uloom London School
 River House Montessori School

Special and alternative schools
 Brick Lane School
 The Complete Works Independent School

References

External links
LB Tower Hamlets education

 
Tower Hamlets